The men's K-2 200 metres canoeing event at the 2011 Pan American Games was held on October 27–29 at the Canoe & Rowing Course in Ciudad Guzman.

Schedule
All times are local Central Daylight Time (UTC−5)

Results

Heats
Qualification Rules: 1..3->Final, 4..7 and 8th best time->Semifinals, Rest Out

Heat 1

Heat 2

Semifinal
Qualification Rules: 1..3->Final, Rest Out

Final

References

Canoeing at the 2011 Pan American Games